CJIJ-FM (branded as C99 FM) is a Canadian radio station, broadcasting in FM stereo at a frequency of 99.9 MHz from Membertou, Nova Scotia, a First Nations community near Sydney. CJIJ plays a variety of rock music.

The station received CRTC approval in 2002 and went on the air in 2003.

On January 29, 2021 Membertou Radio Association Inc. requested to the CRTC a voluntary revocation of their license, which was carried out on February 22, 2021.

References

External links
 CJIJ-FM Facebook
 

Jij
Radio stations established in 2003
2003 establishments in Nova Scotia